"Dosed" is a song by the Red Hot Chili Peppers from their 2002 album, By the Way. It was released as a promotional single in the United States and Canada only. It peaked at number 13 on the U.S. Modern Rock Tracks chart in 2003. No music video was made for the single.

Background
The song features four guitars, played by John Frusciante and Flea, all playing completely different riffs. The chorus is sung by John Frusciante and Anthony Kiedis alternating each line. A ballad that clocks in at 5:11, it is the third-longest track on the album. It runs through stages, each time repeating the original verse until the song's completion. In between the verses, guitar solos can be heard from the four guitars that play.

Live performances
While the song was a single and popular song, "Dosed" was never performed live with John Frusciante. "Dosed" was teased by Frusciante in Copenhagen, Denmark, in 2006, and by  Josh Klinghoffer in Athens, Greece and Istanbul, Turkey in 2012, and in Rio de Janeiro and São Paulo in 2013. On May 28, 2017 in Edmonton, "Dosed" was performed for the first time in its entirety during the band's The Getaway World Tour with opening act IRONTOM's Zach Irons, son of founding Chili Peppers' drummer Jack Irons, providing a second guitar to the song to honor a 17-year-old terminally ill fan, Maggie Schmidt.

Personnel
Red Hot Chili Peppers
Anthony Kiedis - lead vocals
John Frusciante - guitar, vocals, electric piano
Flea - bass, additional guitar
Chad Smith - drums

Charts

References

Red Hot Chili Peppers songs
2003 singles
Song recordings produced by Rick Rubin
2000s ballads
Songs written by Flea (musician)
Songs written by John Frusciante
Songs written by Anthony Kiedis
Songs written by Chad Smith
2002 songs